Uwe Friedrichsen (27 May 1934, in Altona – 30 April 2016, in Hamburg) was a German television actor.

Filmography

External links

Scherf Agency Berlin 

1934 births
2016 deaths
German male television actors
20th-century German male actors
21st-century German male actors
Male actors from Hamburg